Herman Henry Riddick (July 28, 1907 – September 26, 1968) was an American football coach.  He was the ninth head football coach at North Carolina College at Durham—now known as North Carolina Central University, serving for 20 seasons, from 1945 to 1964, and compiling a record of 112–57–10.  His tenure is the longest of any coach in the history of the North Carolina Central Eagles football program.

A native of Gatesville, North Carolina, Riddick played college football at North Carolina College before graduating with a bachelor's degree in 1933.  He began his coaching career in 1936 at Hillside High School, in Durham, North Carolina.  Riddick died on September 26, 1968, in Durham.

Head coaching record

College

References

1907 births
1968 deaths
North Carolina Central Eagles football coaches
North Carolina Central Eagles football players
High school football coaches in North Carolina
People from Gatesville, North Carolina
Players of American football from North Carolina
African-American coaches of American football
African-American players of American football
20th-century African-American sportspeople